Cyperus xanthostachyus is a species of sedge that is native to South America, with a scattered distribution extending from Colombia in the north down to Chile in the south.

The species was first formally described by the botanist Ernst Gottlieb von Steudel in 1842.

See also
 List of Cyperus species

References

xanthostachyus
Plants described in 1842
Taxa named by Ernst Gottlieb von Steudel
Flora of Bolivia
Flora of Uruguay
Flora of Argentina
Flora of Chile
Flora of Colombia